Oleh Ivanovych Boychyshyn (born 12 August 1973 in Lviv, Ukrainian SSR) is a Ukrainian retired football defender and current football manager.

Career
Boychyshyn is a product of the FC Karpaty Lviv academy. His professional career he spent in lower football leagues of Ukraine. After retirement as a player Boychyshyn became a children coach in the Karpaty's academy. In 2011–12, he became an assistant manager of FC Karpaty-2 Lviv, later moved to Lithuania where he coached FK Utenis Utena. On 21 October 2017, Boychyshyn was appointed a head coach of FC Karpaty Lviv.

External links
 
 

1973 births
Living people
Sportspeople from Lviv
Ukrainian footballers
Association football goalkeepers
Ukraine under-21 international footballers
Ukrainian Premier League players
FC Karpaty Lviv players
FC Volyn Lutsk players
FC Lviv (1992) players
FC Podillya Khmelnytskyi players
FC Sokil Zolochiv players
FC Frunzenets-Liha-99 Sumy players
Ukrainian football managers
FK Utenis Utena managers
FC Karpaty Lviv managers
Ukrainian Premier League managers
A Lyga managers
Ukrainian expatriate football managers
Expatriate football managers in Lithuania
Ukrainian expatriate sportspeople in Lithuania